Wahab Bin Dolah (born 15 November 1950) is a Malaysian politician. He was the Member of the Parliament of Malaysia for the Igan constituency in Sarawak, representing the United Traditional Bumiputera Party (PBB) in the ruling Barisan Nasional coalition.

Early life, education and career 
Wahab Dolah was born on 15 November 1950 at Kampung Tian,Matu, Sarawak. Wahab Dolah has Nine siblings namely Rapiah, Jemani, Jamilah, Telaman, Ali mat, Mariam, Nasibah and Sa'id. Wahab undertook his early schooling at Sekolah Kebangsaan(SK) Bawang Tian, Matu before furthering his study at Sekolah Menengah Kebangsaan(SMK) Sibu Rural, SMK Penghulu Kedit, Kanowit and Kolej Tun Datuk Tuanku Haji Bujang at Tanjung Lobang, Miri. Wahab pursue his higher education at University of Western Australia (Under Colomo Plan) and graduated on 1969 in bachelor's degree of Civil Engineering

After finishing his study, on 1974 Wahab worked at Jabatan Kerja Raya (JKR) as Regional Engineer at JKR Sarikei until 1975. On 1976 Wahab has been appointed as production manager at Sarawak Timber Industry Development Corporation (STIDC) until 1977. Wahab big break came when he founded WHS Consultant (Civil Engineering Consultant Firm) from 1978 until 1984.

Political career 
During his tenure at WHS Consultant, Wahab been courted by Parti Pesaka Bumiputera Bersatu (PBB) leadership, to represent PBB at Sarawak 4th State election under N.24 Matu-Daro constituency. Being regarded as prominent public figure in his hometown, Wahab win the constituency uncontested. For the next 4 state election (1987,1991,1996 and 2001), Wahab successfully retain his seat as representative. Among the 4 state election, the infamous 1987 which triggered by Ming Court Affair garner Wahab the title 'Giant Killer" after beating former Chief Minister of Sarawak and Yang di-Pertua Negeri Sarawak Abdul Rahman Ya'kub with a majority of 1625 votes.

Before entering federal Parliament, Wahab was active in Sarawak state politics, serving as State Assemblyman for Matu Daro from 1983, and as a member of the Sarawak Cabinet. He resigned from the State Cabinet in 2004, when he was elected to federal Parliament for the seat of Kuala Rajang. In the 2008 election he moved to the newly created seat of Igan. Both his 2004 and 2008 elections were unopposed. In 2013 he faced his first electoral opposition, a Pan-Malaysian Islamic Party (PAS) candidate whom he defeated with almost 87% of the vote.

References

Living people
1950 births
People from Sarawak
Members of the Dewan Rakyat
Members of the Sarawak State Legislative Assembly
Parti Pesaka Bumiputera Bersatu politicians
Malaysian Muslims